Seoul Metropolitan City Route 31 is a trunk road located in Seoul, South Korea.

Stopovers

 Seoul
 Songpa District - Gwangjin District - Seongdong District

List of Facilities 
IS: Intersection, IC: Interchange

References

Roads in Seoul